Opostegoides thailandica is a moth of the family Opostegidae. It was described by Puplesis and Robinson in 1999, and is known from the Loei Province in Thailand.

External links

Opostegidae
Moths described in 1999